This is a list of members of the European Parliament for the Netherlands in the 1958 to 1979 session.

Alphabetical

| style="text-align:left;" colspan="11" | 
|-
! Name
! Sex
! National Party
! Period
|-
| style="text-align:left;" | Wim Albers
| style="text-align:left;" | Male
| style="text-align:left;" |  Labour Party
| style="text-align:left;" | 3 October 1974 – 17 July 1979
|-
| style="text-align:left;" | Marius van Amelsvoort
| style="text-align:left;" | Male
| style="text-align:left;" |  Catholic People's Party
| style="text-align:left;" | 9 March 1970 – 13 September 1971
|-
| style="text-align:left;" | Jan Baas
| style="text-align:left;" | Male
| style="text-align:left;" |  People's Party for Freedom and Democracy
| style="text-align:left;" | 16 September 1963 – 17 July 1979
|-
| style="text-align:left;" | Nel Barendregt
| style="text-align:left;" | Female
| style="text-align:left;" |  Labour Party
| style="text-align:left;" | 13 March 1973 – 4 June 1973
|-
| style="text-align:left;" | Cees Berkhouwer
| style="text-align:left;" | Male
| style="text-align:left;" |  People's Party for Freedom and Democracy
| style="text-align:left;" | 16 September 1963 – 12 July 1979
|-
| style="text-align:left;" | Barend Biesheuvel
| style="text-align:left;" | Male
| style="text-align:left;" |  Anti-Revolutionary Party
| style="text-align:left;" | 7 March 1961 – 24 July 1963
|-
| style="text-align:left;" | Pieter Blaisse
| style="text-align:left;" | Male
| style="text-align:left;" |  Catholic People's Party
| style="text-align:left;" | 1 January 1958 – 8 May 1967
|-
| style="text-align:left;" | Jaap Boersma
| style="text-align:left;" | Male
| style="text-align:left;" |  Anti-Revolutionary Party
| style="text-align:left;" | 8 May 1967 – 6 July 1971
|-
| style="text-align:left;" | Kees Boertien
| style="text-align:left;" | Male
| style="text-align:left;" |  Anti-Revolutionary Party
| style="text-align:left;" | 8 May 1967 – 6 July 1971
|-
| style="text-align:left;" | Corstiaan Bos
| style="text-align:left;" | Male
| style="text-align:left;" |  Christian Historical Union
| style="text-align:left;" | 12 March 1969 – 6 June 1973
|-
| style="text-align:left;" | Jan Broeksz
| style="text-align:left;" | Male
| style="text-align:left;" |  Labour Party
| style="text-align:left;" | 16 November 1970 – 15 July 1979
|-
| style="text-align:left;" | Tiemen Brouwer
| style="text-align:left;" | Male
| style="text-align:left;" |  Catholic People's Party
| style="text-align:left;" | 8 May 1967 – 11 May 1973
|-
| style="text-align:left;" | Jaap Burger
| style="text-align:left;" | Male
| style="text-align:left;" |  Labour Party
| style="text-align:left;" | 20 October 1966 – 29 September 1970
|-
| style="text-align:left;" | Flip van Campen
| style="text-align:left;" | Male
| style="text-align:left;" |  Catholic People's Party
| style="text-align:left;" | 25 February 1958 – 10 May 1971
|-
| style="text-align:left;" | Frederik Gerard van Dijk
| style="text-align:left;" | Male
| style="text-align:left;" |  People's Party for Freedom and Democracy
| style="text-align:left;" | 22 June 1959 – 4 September 1963
|-
| style="text-align:left;" | Doeke Eisma
| style="text-align:left;" | Male
| style="text-align:left;" |  Democrats 66
| style="text-align:left;" | 13 May 1973 – 2 October 1974
|-
| style="text-align:left;" | Maarten Engwirda
| style="text-align:left;" | Male
| style="text-align:left;" |  Democrats 66
| style="text-align:left;" | 22 September 1971 – 12 March 1973
|-
| style="text-align:left;" | Wilhelm Friedrich de Gaay Fortman
| style="text-align:left;" | Male
| style="text-align:left;" |  Anti-Revolutionary Party
| style="text-align:left;" | 13 March 1978 – 15 July 1979
|-
| style="text-align:left;" | Marinus van der Goes van Naters
| style="text-align:left;" | Male
| style="text-align:left;" |  Labour Party
| style="text-align:left;" | 1 January 1958 – 7 May 1967
|-
| style="text-align:left;" | Wessel Hartog
| style="text-align:left;" | Male
| style="text-align:left;" |  Communist Party of the Netherlands
| style="text-align:left;" | 17 October 1974 – 1 September 1976
|-
| style="text-align:left;" | Cees Hazenbosch
| style="text-align:left;" | Male
| style="text-align:left;" |  Anti-Revolutionary Party
| style="text-align:left;" | 1 January 1958 – 10 January 1961
|-
| style="text-align:left;" | Arie van der Hek
| style="text-align:left;" | Male
| style="text-align:left;" |  Labour Party
| style="text-align:left;" | 3 July 1973 – 17 October 1977
|-
| style="text-align:left;" | Johan van Hulst
| style="text-align:left;" | Male
| style="text-align:left;" |  Christian Historical Union
| style="text-align:left;" | 16 October 1961 – 30 September 1968
|-
| style="text-align:left;" | M.M.A.A. Janssen
| style="text-align:left;" | Male
| style="text-align:left;" |  Catholic People's Party
| style="text-align:left;" | 1 January 1958 – 25 September 1963
|-
| style="text-align:left;" | Jan de Koning
| style="text-align:left;" | Male
| style="text-align:left;" |  Anti-Revolutionary Party
| style="text-align:left;" | 22 September 1971 – 19 December 1977
|-
| style="text-align:left;" | Henk Korthals
| style="text-align:left;" | Male
| style="text-align:left;" |  People's Party for Freedom and Democracy
| style="text-align:left;" | 1 January 1958 – 19 May 1959
|-
| style="text-align:left;" | Reint Laan
| style="text-align:left;" | Male
| style="text-align:left;" |  Labour Party
| style="text-align:left;" | 16 June 1965 – 1 March 1968
|-
| style="text-align:left;" | Cees Laban
| style="text-align:left;" | Male
| style="text-align:left;" |  Labour Party
| style="text-align:left;" | 3 July 1973 – 5 September 1977
|-
| style="text-align:left;" | Jan Lamberts
| style="text-align:left;" | Male
| style="text-align:left;" |  Labour Party
| style="text-align:left;" | 24 October 1977 – 17 July 1979
|-
| style="text-align:left;" | Pierre Lardinois
| style="text-align:left;" | Male
| style="text-align:left;" |  Catholic People's Party
| style="text-align:left;" | 14 October 1963 – 5 April 1967
|-
| style="text-align:left;" | Franz Lichtenauer
| style="text-align:left;" | Male
| style="text-align:left;" |  Christian Historical Union
| style="text-align:left;" | 1 January 1958 – 1 October 1961
|-
| style="text-align:left;" | Durk van der Mei
| style="text-align:left;" | Male
| style="text-align:left;" |  Christian Historical Union
| style="text-align:left;" | 9 March 1976 – 30 December 1977
|-
| style="text-align:left;" | Joep Mommersteeg
| style="text-align:left;" | Male
| style="text-align:left;" |  Catholic People's Party
| style="text-align:left;" | 22 September 1971 – 11 May 1973
|-
| style="text-align:left;" | Gerard Nederhorst
| style="text-align:left;" | Male
| style="text-align:left;" |  Labour Party
| style="text-align:left;" | 1 January 1958 – 29 September 1965
|-
| style="text-align:left;" | Harrij Notenboom
| style="text-align:left;" | Male
| style="text-align:left;" |  Catholic People's Party
| style="text-align:left;" | 22 September 1971 – 17 July 1979
|-
| style="text-align:left;" | Ad Oele
| style="text-align:left;" | Male
| style="text-align:left;" |  Labour Party
| style="text-align:left;" | 21 October 1965 – 16 January 1973
|-
| style="text-align:left;" | Schelto Patijn
| style="text-align:left;" | Male
| style="text-align:left;" |  Labour Party
| style="text-align:left;" | 3 July 1973 – 16 July 1979
|-
| style="text-align:left;" | Kees van der Ploeg
| style="text-align:left;" | Male
| style="text-align:left;" |  Catholic People's Party
| style="text-align:left;" | 19 March 1958 – 14 September 1971
|-
| style="text-align:left;" | Siep Posthumus
| style="text-align:left;" | Male
| style="text-align:left;" |  Labour Party
| style="text-align:left;" | 19 March 1958 – 24 May 1965 and11 May 1968 – 15 September 1971
|-
| style="text-align:left;" | Jan Pronk
| style="text-align:left;" | Male
| style="text-align:left;" |  Labour Party
| style="text-align:left;" | 13 March 1973 – 11 May 1973
|-
| style="text-align:left;" | Kees Raedts
| style="text-align:left;" | Male
| style="text-align:left;" |  Catholic People's Party
| style="text-align:left;" | 11 May 1967 – 11 February 1970
|-
| style="text-align:left;" | Willem Rip
| style="text-align:left;" | Male
| style="text-align:left;" |  Anti-Revolutionary Party
| style="text-align:left;" | 1 January 1958 – 8 February 1959
|-
| style="text-align:left;" | Jacqueline Rutgers
| style="text-align:left;" | Female
| style="text-align:left;" |  Anti-Revolutionary Party
| style="text-align:left;" | 14 October 1963 – 8 May 1967
|-
| style="text-align:left;" | Piet van der Sanden
| style="text-align:left;" | Male
| style="text-align:left;" |  Catholic People's Party
| style="text-align:left;" | 3 July 1973 – 3 October 1974
|-
| style="text-align:left;" | Maan Sassen
| style="text-align:left;" | Male
| style="text-align:left;" |  Catholic People's Party
| style="text-align:left;" | 1 January 1958 – 13 February 1958
|-
| style="text-align:left;" | Willem Scholten
| style="text-align:left;" | Male
| style="text-align:left;" |  Christian Historical Union
| style="text-align:left;" | 25 June 1973 – 1 March 1976
|-
| style="text-align:left;" | Jo Schouwenaar-Franssen
| style="text-align:left;" | Female
| style="text-align:left;" |  People's Party for Freedom and Democracy
| style="text-align:left;" | 16 January 1961 – 24 July 1963
|-
| style="text-align:left;" | Wim Schuijt
| style="text-align:left;" | Male
| style="text-align:left;" |  Catholic People's Party
| style="text-align:left;" | 19 March 1958 – 18 January 1977
|-
| style="text-align:left;" | Max van der Stoel
| style="text-align:left;" | Male
| style="text-align:left;" |  Labour Party
| style="text-align:left;" | 22 September 1971 – 11 May 1973
|-
| style="text-align:left;" | Teun Tolman
| style="text-align:left;" | Male
| style="text-align:left;" |  Christian Historical Union
| style="text-align:left;" | 19 January 1978 – 17 July 1979
|-
| style="text-align:left;" | Wim Vergeer
| style="text-align:left;" | Male
| style="text-align:left;" |  Catholic People's Party
| style="text-align:left;" | 19 January 1978 – 17 July 1979
|-
| style="text-align:left;" | Henk Vredeling
| style="text-align:left;" | Male
| style="text-align:left;" |  Labour Party
| style="text-align:left;" | 19 March 1958 – 11 May 1973
|-
| style="text-align:left;" | Henk Waltmans
| style="text-align:left;" | Male
| style="text-align:left;" |  Political Party of Radicals
| style="text-align:left;" | 16 September 1976 – 17 October 1977
|-
| style="text-align:left;" | Tjerk Westerterp
| style="text-align:left;" | Male
| style="text-align:left;" |  Catholic People's Party
| style="text-align:left;" | 8 May 1967 – 17 Augustus 1971
|-
| style="text-align:left;" | Ep Wieldraaijer
| style="text-align:left;" | Male
| style="text-align:left;" |  Labour Party
| style="text-align:left;" | 3 July 1973 – 19 September 1974
|-
| style="text-align:left;" | Bob de Wilde
| style="text-align:left;" | Male
| style="text-align:left;" |  People's Party for Freedom and Democracy
| style="text-align:left;" | 14 May 1959 – 20 December 1960
|-style="background-color:#dcdcdc"
| style="text-align:left;" colspan="5" |Source:
|-
|}

By party

Labour Party
Wim Albers, from 3 October 1974 until 17 July 1979
Nel Barendregt, from 13 March 1973 until 4 June 1973
Jan Broeksz, from 16 November 1970 until 15 July 1979
Jaap Burger, from 20 October 1966 until 29 September 1970
Marinus van der Goes van Naters, from 1 January 1958 until 7 May 1967
Arie van der Hek, from 3 July 1973 until 17 October 1977
Reint Laan, from 16 June 1965 until 1 March 1968
Cees Laban, from 3 July 1973 until 5 September 1977
Jan Lamberts, from 24 October 1977 until 17 July 1979
Gerard Nederhorst, from 1 January 1958 until 29 September 1965
Ad Oele, from 21 October 1965 until 16 January 1973
Schelto Patijn, from 3 July 1973 until 16 July 1979
Siep Posthumus, from 19 March 1958 until 24 May 1965 and from 11 May 1968 until 15 September 1971
Jan Pronk, from 13 March 1973 until 11 May 1973
Max van der Stoel, from 22 September 1971 until 11 May 1973
Henk Vredeling, from 19 March 1958 until 11 May 1973
Ep Wieldraaijer, from 3 July 1973 until 19 September 1974

Catholic People's Party
Marius van Amelsvoort, from 9 March 1970 until 13 September 1971
Pieter Blaisse, from 1 January 1958 until 8 May 1967
Tiemen Brouwer, from 8 May 1967 until 11 May 1973
Flip van Campen, from 25 February 1958 until 10 May 1971
M.M.A.A. Janssen, from 1 January 1958 until 25 September 1963
Pierre Lardinois, from 14 October 1963 until 5 April 1967
Joep Mommersteeg, from 22 September 1971 until 11 May 1973
Harrij Notenboom, from 22 September 1971 until 17 July 1979
Kees van der Ploeg, from 19 March 1958 until 14 September 1971
Kees Raedts, from 11 May 1967 until 11 February 1970
Piet van der Sanden, from 3 July 1973 until 3 October 1974
Maan Sassen, from 1 January 1958 until 13 February 1958
Wim Schuijt, from 19 March 1958 until 18 January 1977
Wim Vergeer, from 19 January 1978 until 17 July 1979
Tjerk Westerterp, from 8 May 1967 until 17 Augustus 1971

Anti-Revolutionary Party
Barend Biesheuvel, from 7 March 1961 until 24 July 1963
Jaap Boersma, from 8 May 1967 until 6 July 1971
Kees Boertien, from 8 May 1967 until 6 July 1971
Wilhelm Friedrich de Gaay Fortman, from 13 March 1978 until 15 July 1979
Cees Hazenbosch, from 1 January 1958 until 10 January 1961
Jan de Koning, from 22 September 1971 until 19 December 1977
Willem Rip, from 1 January 1958 until 8 February 1959
Jacqueline Rutgers, from 14 October 1963 until 8 May 1967

People's Party for Freedom and Democracy
Jan Baas, from 16 September 1963 until 17 July 1979
Cees Berkhouwer, from 16 September 1963 until 12 July 1979
Frederik Gerard van Dijk, from 22 June 1959 until 4 September 1963
Henk Korthals, from 1 January 1958 until 19 May 1959
Jo Schouwenaar-Franssen, from 16 January 1961 until 24 July 1963
Bob de Wilde, from 14 May 1959 until 20 December 1960

Christian Historical Union
Corstiaan Bos, from 12 March 1969 until 6 June 1973
Johan van Hulst, from 16 October 1961 until 30 September 1968
Franz Lichtenauer, from 1 January 1958 until 1 October 1961
Durk van der Mei, from 9 March 1976 until 30 December 1977
Willem Scholten, from 25 June 1973 until 1 March 1976
Teun Tolman, from 19 January 1978 until 17 July 1979

Democrats 66
Doeke Eisma, from 13 May 1973 until 2 October 1974
Maarten Engwirda, from 22 September 1971 until 12 March 1973

Political Party of Radicals
Henk Waltmans, from 16 September 1976 until 17 October 1977

Communist Party of the Netherlands
Wessel Hartog, from 17 October 1974 until 1 September 1976

References 

Netherlands
List
1958